In the United States the Armed Services Procurement Act  established the Armed Services Procurement Regulations (ASPR) which were in effect from 1948 to 1978.  The first complete ASPR was published by the Department of Defense in 1959.

External link
 Armed Services Procurement Act of 1947

See also
  Federal Acquisition Regulation
  Title 48 of the Code of Federal Regulations
  Office of Federal Procurement Policy

References

Government procurement in the United States
1948 establishments in the United States
1978 disestablishments in the United States